The 2017–18 Alabama–Huntsville Chargers ice hockey team represented the University of Alabama in Huntsville in the 2017–18 NCAA Division I men's ice hockey season. The Chargers were coached by Mike Corbett who was in his fifth season as head coach. His assistant coaches were Gavin Morgan and Matty Thomas. The Chargers played their home games in the Propst Arena at the Von Braun Center and competed in the Western Collegiate Hockey Association.

Recruiting
UAH added 8 freshmen for the 2017–18 season, including 2 goalies, 5 forwards and 1 defenseman.

Roster

Departures from 2016–17 team
Hunter Anderson, F, transferred to University of Wisconsin–Stout (NCAA D-III)
Brandon Carlson, F, graduated, signed with the Wichita Thunder (ECHL)
Brent Fletcher, F, graduated
Carmine Guerriero, F, graduated, signed with the South Carolina Stingrays (ECHL)
Jetlan Houcher, F
Matt Larose, F, graduated, signed with HC 07 Detva (Slovak Extraliga)
Cody Marooney, F, graduated
Matt Salhany, F, graduated, signed with the Reading Royals (ECHL)
Regan Soquila, F, graduated

2017–18 team
Source:

|}

Schedule and results
  Green background indicates win.
  Red background indicates loss.
  Yellow background indicates tie.

|-
!colspan=12 style=""| Regular Season

|-
!colspan=12 style=""| WCHA Tournament

Standings

Player stats
As of March 4, 2018

Skaters

Goalies

References

Alabama–Huntsville Chargers men's ice hockey seasons
Alabama Huntsville
Alabama-Huntsville Chargers men's ice hockey
Alabama-Huntsville Chargers men's ice hockey